Kevin Sweeney may refer to:

 Kevin Sweeney (American football) (born 1963), American football player
 Kevin J. Sweeney (born 1970), Roman Catholic bishop of Paterson, New Jersey
 Kevin Sweeney, convicted of murder of his wife Suzanne, see Kevin Sweeney case